"Can't Stop the Shine" is the second single from American hip hop artist Kool G Rap's 1998 album Roots of Evil, featuring Miss Jones.

Background
"Can't Stop the Shine" is a Mafioso rap song in which Kool G Rap spits two verses and features a chorus sung by R&B singer Miss Jones.

Music video
The music video for "Can't Stop the Shine" shows Kool G Rap and Miss Jones partying on a lavish yacht, and Kool G Rap surviving as assassination attempt by two hitmen in his villa.

Samples
"Can't Stop the Shine" samples the following songs:
"What Cha' Gonna Do with My Lovin" by Stephanie Mills

Track listing
A-side
 "Can't Stop the Shine" (Clean)
 "Can't Stop the Shine" (Album Version)
 "Can't Stop the Shine" (Acapella)
 "Can't Stop the Shine" (Instrumental)

B-side
 "Thugs Anthem" (Clean)
 "Thugs Anthem" (Album Version)
 "Thugs Anthem" (Acapella)
 "Thugs Anthem" (Instrumental)

References

External links
 "Can't Stop the Shine" at Discogs

1998 singles
Kool G Rap songs
Songs written by Kool G Rap
Gangsta rap songs
American contemporary R&B songs
1998 songs